Karl Aben (Latvian: Kārlis Abens; 23 September 1896 – 22 October 1976) was an Estonian and Latvian linguist and translator. In Estonia, he became known as the country's foremost translator from Latvian at the time (translated works of Jānis Rainis, Vilis Lācis and Andrejs Upīts, among many others), but he also translated from Estonian into Latvian (Oskar Luts Abandoned House). Aben was born into an Estonian family in Northern Latvia, he studied at the University of Tartu, graduating with a degree in philology in 1940. 

From 1940 to 1941 he worked at the University of Riga as a lecturer of Estonian and Finnish. From 1944 to 1961 he worked at the University of Tartu.

Aben published numerous articles on Estonian and Latvian literature and relations, as well as pedagogy and linguistics. He also compiled the first Estonian-Latvian and Latvian-Estonian dictionaries.

References

1896 births
1976 deaths
Estonian translators
University of Tartu alumni
Soviet translators
Linguists from the Soviet Union